Ioannis Virvilis (born 7 May 1941) is a Greek middle-distance runner. He competed in the men's 1500 metres at the 1968 Summer Olympics.

References

1941 births
Living people
Athletes (track and field) at the 1968 Summer Olympics
Greek male middle-distance runners
Olympic athletes of Greece
Place of birth missing (living people)